Sudół may refer to the following places:
Sudół, Jędrzejów County in Świętokrzyskie Voivodeship (south-central Poland)
Sudół, Ostrowiec County in Świętokrzyskie Voivodeship (south-central Poland)
Sudół, Pińczów County in Świętokrzyskie Voivodeship (south-central Poland)